The Arkansas State Red Wolves football team represents Arkansas State University in National Collegiate Athletic Association (NCAA) Division I Football Bowl Subdivision (FBS) college football competition. The team was founded in 1911 and has competed as a member of the Sun Belt Conference since 2001. Their home field is Centennial Bank Stadium and the head coach is Butch Jones.

The Red Wolves have claimed 12 conference championships. Arkansas State's most recent conference championship came in 2016. The team claims one national championship, which came in 1970 at the NCAA Division II level. 

In 2008, the school changed its mascot from the Indians to the Red Wolves.

History

Early years (1911–1953)
The school was founded in 1909, and, two years later, Arkansas State fielded its first football team. In 1918, the team was temporarily disbanded due to the First World War. Arkansas State played without conference affiliation until 1929 when it joined the Arkansas Intercollegiate Conference. From 1937 until 1953, Arkansas State competed as a member of the National Junior College Athletic Association (NJCAA). After the 1941 season, the football program was interrupted due to World War II and did not resume until the 1945 season. The school left the AIC in 1950 and would remain independent of conference affiliation for the next 12 years.

During the 1950s under coach Forrest England, A-State emerged as a bit of a regional football power, appearing in four post-season bowl games from 1951 to 1953. The Indians compiled a 48–22–9 record under England. The Indians played in two bowls at the end of the 1951 season, winning the Refrigerator Bowl and losing the Tangerine Bowl (now known as the Capital One Bowl). The Indians lost the 1952 Refrigerator Bowl and tied the 1953 Tangerine Bowl.

College Division years (1953–1972)
In 1953, Arkansas State moved to the NCAA, and played as a member of the College Division through 1972. The early part of this era was characterized by mediocre records under several short-term head coaches. In 1962 head coach King Block departed for Nebraska where he was to serve as defensive line coach.

Bennie Ellender was promoted from defensive backs coach to head coach, replacing Block in 1963 just prior to A-State joining the Southland Conference. Ellender would serve for 8 seasons compiling a 52–20–4 record culminating in an undefeated 11–0 College Division National Championship year in 1970. This championship season included a victory over Central Missouri State in the Pecan Bowl, the Indians' 3rd consecutive bowl appearance under Ellender and 3rd straight Southland Conference championship. Ellender departed after the 1970 season to accept the head football coach position at his alma mater Tulane.

Divisional realignment years (1973–1991)
In 1973, under head coach Bill Davidson, the Indians were assigned to the newly created Division II. They remained in this classification for one year before being promoted to Division I. Arkansas State recorded an undefeated season (going 11–0) in Division I in 1975 and was one of only two undefeated Division I football teams that year. Arkansas State is one of only four institutions to have gone undefeated and not win a National Championship at the Division I-A (now Division I FBS) level. Since Arkansas State was a member of the Southland Conference, and the league did not have a bowl game tie-in, Arkansas State was not selected for post-season play despite being undefeated. As a result of this inequity, the Independence Bowl in Shreveport, Louisiana was created (though A-State has never played in the game). Davidson retired after the 1978 season due to health problems. Davidson compiled a 51–32–1 record during his tenure.

During the 1980s, under head coach Larry Lacewell, Arkansas State played in the NCAA Division I-AA (now Division I FCS) compiling a 69–58–4 record and making four appearances in the playoffs, including a loss in the national championship game in 1986 to Georgia Southern, 48–21. After the 1986 season Arkansas State left the Southland Conference and became a I-AA Independent. Lacewell left A-State in 1989 after 11 seasons to accept an offer to be Johnny Majors' defensive coordinator at Tennessee.

Lacewell's departure came as the decision was being reached for Arkansas State to pursue entry into what is now Division I FBS.

FBS transition years (1992–2010)

The transition from I-AA (FCS) to I-A (FBS) football was a painful one for Arkansas State. The school spent most of the decade as a I-A Independent with two separate two-year stints as a member of the Big West Conference.

Al Kincaid came to Jonesboro from his post as an assistant at Alabama. He served as head coach for two seasons, posting 4–17–1 record before his dismissal. Kincaid was replaced by former Alabama head coach Ray Perkins. Perkins tenure was highly anticipated but ultimately a failure as he posted a 2–9 record in one season before joining Bill Parcells' staff with the New England Patriots as offensive coordinator.

Perkins was replaced by offensive line coach John Bobo who oversaw moderate improvements to the team's performance including A-State's first winning record since the start of the transition but he was unable to sustain that success and was fired after the 1996 season.

Bobo was replaced by the highly sought after offensive coordinator at Ohio State, Joe Hollis. Hollis was unable to adapt and posted a 13–43 record in five seasons before being relieved after the 2001 season.

In 2001 the Sun Belt Conference added football and Arkansas State joined the conference as an inaugural football member.

Steve Roberts came to Arkansas State from Northwestern State and was A-State's head football coach for nine seasons (2002–2010), where he compiled a 45–63 record. Although Roberts finished with an overall losing record at Arkansas State, the A-State football program made great strides under his leadership. During the 2005 football season, Arkansas State finished the regular season as Sun Belt Conference champions with a record of 6 wins and 5 losses and was invited to the New Orleans Bowl. This was the school's first bowl game since the trip to the 1970 Pecan Bowl and subsequent national college division championship. The Indians lost to The University of Southern Mississippi in the game, which was played that year in the city of Lafayette, Louisiana due to the lingering effects of Hurricane Katrina. The NCAA required Arkansas State to forfeit six football wins from the 2006 season and four from 2005 season in football saying the school used ineligible players. The NCAA also said that it has cut one football for two years. The penalties stem from the school allowing 31 ineligible athletes during the 2005–08 seasons because of a failure to meet NCAA rules on progress-toward-degree requirements.

In 2008, Arkansas State changed its name from the Indians to the Red Wolves and defeated Texas A&M in their inaugural game with the new mascot. Players recruited by Roberts were the foundation of the highly successful teams of the "One and Done" era.

Freeze-Malzahn-Harsin era (2011–2013)
This three-year period saw the Red Wolves achieve remarkable success on the field in the midst of turnover in its coaching staff. The players recruited by Steve Roberts played in three conference championships and three bowl games, and had two 10-win seasons under three different head coaches. Red Wolf players played all three bowl games without their head coach and with depleted coaching staffs. The program's continued success during the adversity of constant coaching changes received considerable national attention.

In 2011, led by first-year head coach Hugh Freeze, Arkansas State went undefeated in the Sun Belt conference, a perfect 8–0 record, as well as going 10–2 overall. After the last regular season game, Freeze took the head coaching job at Ole Miss, taking four assistants with him. Running backs coach David Gunn was named the interim head coach and led the team to Mobile, Alabama for the 2012 GoDaddy.com Bowl. In that bowl, held on January 8, 2012, the Red Wolves were led by quarterback Ryan Aplin, as they squared off against the Northern Illinois Huskies at Ladd-Peebles Stadium. Northern Illinois rallied back from a thirteen-point deficit for a 38–20 victory. Also in attendance in Mobile was Gus Malzahn, who was named Arkansas State's new head football coach on December 14, 2011.

Gus Malzahn came to the Red Wolves from Auburn, where he had served the previous three seasons as offensive coordinator. In 2012, Arkansas State lost only one game in the Sun Belt Conference. For the first time in school history, they had back to back 10 win seasons (10–3 in 2012) and back to back Sun Belt conference championships. On December 4, 2012, Malzahn announced his return to Auburn as head coach, thus making it two years in a row the team would be coached by an interim in the post season. John Thompson coached the team to 17–13 victory at the 2013 GoDaddy.com Bowl against No. 25 Kent State on January 6, 2013. Former Texas Longhorns football offensive coordinator Bryan Harsin was named on December 11, 2012, to succeed the departing Malzahn.

In 2013, Arkansas State under Bryan Harsin won the Sun Belt Conference, and received a bid to the GoDaddy Bowl for the 3rd time in as many years with a 7–5 (5–2 conference) regular season record. They were deemed co-champions this year with the UL-Lafayette Ragin Cajuns who were also 5–2 in conference. Before the GoDaddy Bowl, Harsin joined his predecessors in announcing his departure after one season to coach at his alma mater, Boise State. Harsin's contract included a $1.75 million buyout which was paid by Boise State. Defensive Coordinator John Thompson coached the team in the GoDaddy Bowl where Arkansas State blocked a Ball State field goal in the final seconds to hold on to a 23–20 win.

Blake Anderson era (2014–2020) 
On December 19, 2013, Arkansas State hired Blake Anderson as the new head coach away from his offensive coordinator post at the University of North Carolina. In an attempt to end the "One and Done" era and provide much-needed coaching stability, Arkansas State placed a hefty buyout provision in Anderson's $700,000 per year five-year contract specifying a $3 million buyout for the first two years, $2 million for the third and fourth years, and $1 million in the final year.

The Red Wolves opened the 2015 season 0–2 with losses to both No. 8 USC and No. 21 Missouri.  Arkansas State would go on to win 9 of the next 11 with victories over App State and rival Louisiana-Monroe.  With their win over App State on November 5, the Red Wolves glided to their 4th Sun Belt title since 2010 and an appearance in the New Orleans Bowl.

Expectations were high for the 2016 season but the Red Wolves started the campaign with four straight losses to Toledo, Auburn, Utah State and in-state FCS opponent Central Arkansas.  But during Sun Belt Conference play the Red Wolves reeled off six straight victories including a road win against No. 25 Troy that denied the Trojans a share of the Sun Belt crown. The Red Wolves had a chance to secure a sole conference championship by winning its last two games but faltered when a last-second touchdown was reversed by replay at Louisiana. The Red Wolves secured a win in their final regular season game at Texas State which assured them of a shared conference championship with Appalachian State.  The Red Wolves were selected for the 2016 Cure Bowl where they defeated UCF 31–13 in their own hometown. On Dec 10, 2020, Anderson resigned.

Butch Jones era (2020–present)
Butch Jones was announced as the Red Wolves head coach on December 12, 2020. Jones had previous head coaching stints at Central Michigan, Cincinnati  and Tennessee and prior to his hire at Arkansas State was a special assistant to Nick Saban at Alabama.

Division history

Conference affiliations
Arkansas State has been both independent and affiliated with multiple conferences.
 Independent (1911–1929, 1951–1963, 1987–1992, 1996–1998)
 Arkansas Intercollegiate Conference (1930–1950)
 Southland Conference (1964–1986)
 Big West Conference (1993–1995, 1999–2000)
 Sun Belt Conference (2001–present)

Championships

National championships 
Arkansas State claims one national championship, a 1970 NCAA Division II championship.

Conference championships 
Arkansas State claims 12 conference titles, most recently of the Sun Belt Conference in 2016. 

† Co-champions

Postseason games

College division and other bowl games
Arkansas State (then known as the Indians) went 3–3–1 in six games that were "College Division" bowl games prior to the NCAA instituting playoffs for lower division teams in 1973. They participated in two bowl game in one season (1951), playing one on December 2 and the other on January 1.

NCAA Division I-AA playoff games

NCAA Division I FBS bowl games
The Red Wolves have played in ten bowl games, garnering a record of 4–6.

Head coaches
There have been 34 different head coaching tenures at Arkansas State. The current head coach is Butch Jones, who was hired on December 12, 2020. 

† 10 wins later vacated due to NCAA sanctions, 45–63 record on-field.

‡  Interim head coach

Rivalries

Memphis

The series between the Arkansas State Red Wolves and the Memphis Tigers is the oldest as well as the longest the A-State program has had and is the second most often played series for Memphis. The first game was played in 1914.

There have been some memorable moments in the series. In 2004, Memphis defeated Arkansas State 47–35 before 30,427 fans, the largest crowd to ever watch a game at then-named Indian Stadium. In 2006, Arkansas State beat Memphis at the Liberty Bowl Stadium in Memphis, Tennessee after a last second Hail Mary touchdown to secure the win, 26–23, and end a ten-game losing streak to the Tigers. The teams met again in 2007 at Indian Stadium, where the Indians rallied in the second half to beat the Tigers 35–31 after trailing 31–6 at halftime. The schools have met 59 times, with the Tigers leading the series 30–24–5.

In 2016, the schools announced the series will be brought back once again starting in 2020. Arkansas State and Memphis have four games slated from 2020 to 2023. The first game will be played in Memphis on September 5, 2020.

Players

Current NFL players
Don Jones, S
Demario Davis, LB, New Orleans Saints
Kelcie McCray, S, 
Derek Newton, OT
Ryan Carrethers, NT
J. D. McKissic, RB, Washington Football Team
Omar Bayless, WR, Carolina Panthers
Kirk Merritt, WR, Miami Dolphins

Current CFL players
Bryan Hall, DT,
Justin McInnis, WR,
Kendall Sanders WR,
Cody Grace, P
Kyle Wilson, LB

Former players

Reggie Arnold, RB
Fred Barnett, WR
Bill Bergey, LB
Alex Carrington, DT
Maurice Carthon, RB
Carlos Emmons, LB
Leroy Harris, RB
M. D. Jennings, S
Bill Johnson, RB
Tyrell Johnson, S
Ken Jones, OL
Cleo Lemon, QB
Ron Meeks, DB
Dennis Meyer, DB
Jerry Muckensturm, LB
Kyle Richardson, P
Elbert Shelley, DB
Ray Brown, OL
Oren O'Neal, FB
Corey Williams, DT
Mitch Young, DE
James Hickenbotham, All Purpose
David Johnson, TE
Chris Odom, LB

Future non-conference opponents
Announced schedules as of August 9, 2022.

References

External links

 

 
American football teams established in 1911
1911 establishments in Arkansas